Mindreader may refer to:

Mindreader, a person capable of telepathy
Mindreader, a practitioner of mentalism
Mindreaders, a short-lived game show hosted by Dick Martin
The Mind Reader, a 1933 film starring Warren William
"Mind Reader" (Silverchair song), 2007
"Mind Reader" (Dustin Lynch song), 2014
"Mindreader", a song by A Day to Remember from their 2021 album You're Welcome
"Mind Reader", a song by Sebadoh from their 1996 album Harmacy
Mind Reader – An Evening of Wonders, Derren Brown's 2007-08 live stage show

See also
 Mind reading (disambiguation)